In the Dark is the third album from The Whigs. The album was released on March 16, 2010. Recording took place in band's hometown of Athens, Georgia. The band worked extensively with producer Ben Allen, notable for his production work on  Animal Collective's Merriweather Post Pavilion, one of the most critically acclaimed albums of 2009. The album marks the band's first record with new permanent bassist Tim Deaux, replacing bassist Hank Sullivant, who departed the group in 2006 and joined MGMT.

On October 15, 2009 the Whigs released the title track, "In The Dark" as a free download. Two weeks later, the band released "Hundred / Million" for free download on their website.

Track listing
All lyrics written by Parker Gispert; all music composed by The Whigs.
"Hundred / Million"
"Black Lotus"
"Kill Me Carolyne"
"Someone's Daughter"
"So Lonely"
"Dying"
"I Don't Even Care About The One I Love"
"Automatic"
"I Am For Real"
"In The Dark"
"Naked"

References

External links
Official website

2010 albums
The Whigs (band) albums
ATO Records albums